Hosein Adl-ol-Malek Dādgar (1889–1971) was a politician from Iran.

He entered politics in the cabinet of Atābak in 1910, and eventually became Parliament (Majlis) speaker for 4 periods.

1889 births
1971 deaths
Government ministers of Iran
People from Babol
Speakers of the National Consultative Assembly
Members of the 3rd Iranian Majlis
Democrat Party (Persia) politicians
Members of the 5th Iranian Majlis
Members of the 6th Iranian Majlis
Members of the 7th Iranian Majlis
Members of the 8th Iranian Majlis
Members of the 9th Iranian Majlis